Melhem, also written Milhim, is an Arabic surname and masculine given name, meaning "King of the night". Notable bearers of the name include:

Surname
D. H. Melhem (1926–2013), American poet
Mohammed Milhim (1929–2021), Palestinian politician
Hisham Melhem, Lebanese journalist
Cesar Melhem (born 1965), Australian trade unionist
Edgardo Melhem Salinas (born 1969), Mexican politician
Marcius Melhem (born 1972), Brazilian actor and comedian
Adnan Melhem (born 1989), Lebanese footballer
Stephane Milhim (born 1990), American football player

Given name
Melhem Barakat (1942–2016), Lebanese singer
Melhem Karam (1932–2010), Lebanese writer and journalist
Melhem B. Maalouf (1937–1996), Lebanese judge
Melhem Zein (born 1982), Lebanese singer

See also
Məlhəm, Azerbaijan

References

Arabic-language surnames
Arabic masculine given names